Hélène Conway-Mouret (born 13 September 1960 in Bône, French Algeria) is a French academic and politician of the Socialist Party (PS) who has been serving as a member of the Senate since 2014, representing the constituency of French citizens living abroad.

Early life and education
Hélène Conway-Mouret was born on 13 September 1960 in Bône, French Algeria. She graduated from the Lumière University Lyon 2, where she received a Bachelor of Arts degree. She received a Higher Diploma in Education and a Master of Philosophy from Trinity College Dublin. She also received a degree in Management Practice from the Ulster University.

Early career
Conway-Mouret served as the chair of the language department at the Dublin Institute of Technology. She was also a visiting professor at the Pantheon-Sorbonne University.

Political career
Conway-Mouret joined the Socialist Party in 1997. She was Minister for French Expatriates under Minister of Foreign Affairs Laurent Fabius in the cabinet of Prime Minister Jean-Marc Ayrault from June 2012 to March 2014. Additionally, she has served as a member of the Senate of France since September 2011, where she represents French citizens living abroad.

Conway-Mouret has encouraged French students to take part in the Erasmus Programme and live abroad to increase their human capital. She believes that French expatriates reflect well on French diplomacy. Additionally, she has worked on making it easier for French citizens who settle back in France after they have lived abroad for several years to enroll in the French healthcare, retirement and social security systems.

Conway-Mouret supports same-sex marriage. In January 2013, months before it became the law of the land in France via Law 2013-404, she penned an opinion piece in Le Figaro arguing that same-sex marriage had been a success abroad, and that France should look beyond its borders and legalise it.

Conway-Mouret is opposed to the repeal of French citizenship for dual citizens who commit terrorist activities, arguing that it would target dual citizens over regular French citizens. She has penned an opinion piece arguing against the 2016 bill.

Other activities
 Institut du Bosphore, Member of the Scientific Committee
 Agency for French Education Abroad (AEFE), Member of the Board of Directors (2011-2012, 2014–2017)

Recognition
Conway-Mouret is a Knight of the National Order of Merit. She became a Grand Officer of the Order of Saint-Charles in 2013.

References

1960 births
Living people
Alumni of Trinity College Dublin
Alumni of Ulster University
Academics of Dublin Institute of Technology
French Senators of the Fifth Republic
Grand Officers of the Order of Saint-Charles
Knights of the Ordre national du Mérite
Senators of French citizens living abroad
Socialist Party (France) politicians
University of Lyon alumni
Women members of the Senate (France)
People from Annaba
20th-century French women